Coppabella is a rural locality in the Isaac Region, Queensland, Australia. It was established by Queensland Railways to accommodate train crew and railway maintenance staff.

Geography 
Coppabella is in the Galilee Basin mining area. The Peak Downs Highway passes through the locality from north-east to south-west. The Goonyella railway line also passes through the area, with branch lines to service the mines. Two active mines in the area are the Millenium coal mine and Moorvale coal mine, both owned and operated by Peabody Energy.

History 
The locality takes its name from the local railway station, which in turn was named by Queensland Railways Department in September 1971, reportedly using an Aboriginal word meaning a crossing place.

Coppabella State School opened on 29 January 1980.

Education 
Coppabella State School is a government co-educational primary school (P-6) in Mathieson Street. In 2016, the school had an enrolment of 14 students with 2 teachers and 4 non-teaching staff (2 equivalent full-time). In 2017, the school had an enrolment of 17 students with 2 teachers and 4 non-teaching staff (2 full-time equivalent).

There is no secondary school in Coppabella; the nearest is Moranbah State High School in Moranbah.

References

External links 

Isaac Region
Localities in Queensland